Fabio Wagner (born 17 September 1995) is a German ice hockey player for ERC Ingolstadt of the Deutsche Eishockey Liga (DEL) and the German national team.

He represented Germany at the 2021 IIHF World Championship.

Career statistics

Regular season and playoffs

International

References

External links

1995 births
Living people
ERC Ingolstadt players
ESV Kaufbeuren players
EV Landshut players
German ice hockey defencemen
Sportspeople from Landshut
Ice hockey players at the 2022 Winter Olympics
Olympic ice hockey players of Germany